Frederik Holst may refer to:

 Frederik Holst (physician) (1791–1871), Norwegian physician
 Frederik Holst (footballer) (born 1994), Danish footballer